Juan David Mosquera López (born 5 September 2002) is a Colombian professional footballer who plays as a full-back for Major League Soccer club Portland Timbers.

Career statistics

Club

Notes

References

2002 births
Living people
Colombian footballers
Colombia youth international footballers
Association football forwards
Independiente Medellín footballers
Categoría Primera A players
Footballers from Cali
Portland Timbers players
Major League Soccer players
Colombia international footballers